Solar Star is a 579-megawatt (MWAC) photovoltaic power station near Rosamond, California, United States, that is operated and maintained by SunPower Services. When completed in June 2015, it was the world's largest solar farm in terms of installed capacity, using 1.7 million solar panels, made by SunPower and spread over 13 square kilometers (3,200 acres).

Comparison to similar plants 

Compared to other photovoltaic plants of similar size, Solar Star uses a smaller number (1.7 million) of large form-factor, high-wattage, high-efficiency, higher cost crystalline silicon modules, mounted on single axis trackers. In contrast, the Desert Sunlight Solar Farm and the Topaz Solar Farm (550 MW each) use a larger number (roughly 9 million) of smaller form-factor, lower wattage, lower efficiency, lower cost thin-film CdTe photovoltaic modules, mounted on fixed-tilt arrays and spread over a larger land area. Both approaches appear commercially viable.

There are a number of other solar photovoltaic plants nearby:
Antelope Valley Solar Ranch (266 MW from 3.8 million thin film panels)
Alpine Solar (66 MW AC, thin film panels)
Catalina Solar Project (60 MW, thin film panels)

Electricity production

Solar Star 1's nameplate capacities are 398 MWdc and 314 MWac.

Solar Star 2's nameplate capacities are 350 MWdc and 266 MWac.

See also 

 Solar power in California
 List of photovoltaic power stations

References

External links 
 Fact sheet from SunPower

Solar power stations in California
Photovoltaic power stations in the United States
Buildings and structures in Kern County, California
Energy infrastructure completed in 2015